"Timeless" is a song by British-Australian recording artist Reece Mastin, taken from his second studio album, Beautiful Nightmare (2012). It was released as a digital download on 1 March 2013, as the fourth single from the album. The song peaked at number 85 on the ARIA Singles Chart. "Timeless" was written by Mastin, Anthony Egizii and David Musumeci, and produced by the latter two under their production name DNA.

Music video
A music video to accompany the release of "Timeless" was first released onto YouTube on 15 February 2013 at a total length of three minutes and fifty-four seconds.

Track listing

Credits and personnel
Credits adapted from the liner notes of Beautiful Nightmare.

Locations
Recorded at Studios 301 and Sony Studios in Sydney.
Mastered at Studios 301 in Sydney.

Personnel
Songwriting – Reece Mastin, Anthony Egizii, David Musumeci
Production – DNA
Mixing – Anthony Egizii
Programming and keys – Anthony Egizii
Guitars – David Musumeci
Additional acoustic guitars – Carl Dimataga
Mastering – Leon Zervos

Charts

Release history

References

2013 singles
Reece Mastin songs
Song recordings produced by DNA Songs
2012 songs
Sony Music Australia singles
Songs written by Anthony Egizii
Songs written by David Musumeci